Brandon Pickersgill (born 29 March 1997) is an English professional rugby league footballer who plays as a  or  for the Bradford Bulls, on short-term loan from Featherstone Rovers in Betfred Championship.

Background
Pickersgill was born in Bradford, West Yorkshire, England. He attended Bradford Academy in East Bowling.

He is a product of the Bradford Bulls Academy system.

Playing career

Bradford Bulls
2017 - 2017 Season

Pickersgill featured in the pre-season friendlies against Huddersfield Giants and Keighley Cougars.

Brandon featured in Round 12 (Toulouse Olympique) and then in Round 17 (Featherstone Rovers). He also played in Round 23 (Swinton Lions). Pickersgill also featured in the Championship Shield Game 4 (Batley Bulldogs).

At the end of the season Brandon signed a 3 Year contract extension with the Bulls.

2018 - 2018 Season

Pickersgill featured in the pre-season friendlies against Halifax R.L.F.C., Sheffield Eagles, Dewsbury Rams, Toronto Wolfpack and Keighley Cougars. He scored against Keighley Cougars (1 try).

Brandon featured in Round 1 (York City Knights) to Round 3 (Keighley Cougars) then in Round 6 (Workington Town) to Round 15 (Coventry Bears). He also featured in Round 19 (London Skolars) to Round 23 (Keighley Cougars) then in Round 25 (Oldham R.L.F.C.) to Round 26 (Hemel Stags). Pickersgill also played in the 2018 Challenge Cup in Round 3 (West Wales Raiders) to Round 5 (Warrington Wolves). He scored against West Wales Raiders (2 tries), London Skolars (2 tries), Hemel Stags (2 tries), North Wales Crusaders (1 try), Doncaster R.L.F.C. (2 tries), Newcastle Thunder (1 try) and Whitehaven R.L.F.C. (1 try).

At the end of the season Brandon signed a 2 Year extension.

2019 - 2019 Season

Brandon featured in the pre-season friendly against York City Knights.

Pickersgill played in Round 1 (Featherstone Rovers) to Round 7 (Widnes Vikings) then in Round 11 (Barrow Raiders). Brandon also played in Round 13 (Toronto Wolfpack) then in Round 15 (Featherstone Rovers). Pickersgill featured in Round 18 (Halifax R.L.F.C.) to Round 21 (Swinton Lions) then in Round 23 (Toronto Wolfpack) to Round 27 (Rochdale Hornets). He also featured in the 2019 Challenge Cup in Round 4 (Keighley Cougars). Brandon played in the 2019 RFL 1985 Cup in Round 2 (Barrow Raiders). He scored against York City Knights (1 try), Barrow Raiders (2 tries), Widnes Vikings (1 try), Toulouse Olympique (1 try), Swinton Lions (1 try), Dewsbury Rams (1 try), Sheffield Eagles (1 try) and Rochdale Hornets (1 try).

2020 - 2020 Season

Brandon featured in the pre-season friendlies against Castleford Tigers, Leeds Rhinos and York City Knights.

Pickersgill played in Round 1 (London Broncos) to Round 5 (Sheffield Eagles). Brandon also featured in the 2020 Challenge Cup in Round 4 (Underbank Rangers) to Round 5 (Wakefield Trinity). He scored against Featherstone Rovers (1 try), Oldham R.L.F.C. (1 try) and Sheffield Eagles (1 try).

He signed a one year extension to stay at the Bulls for the 2021 season.

2021 - 2021 Season

Brandon featured in the pre-season friendly against Swinton Lions. He scored against Swinton Lions (1 try).

Brandon played in Round 1 (Sheffield Eagles) to Round 9 (Featherstone Rovers) then in Round 11 (Widnes Vikings) to Round 20 (Toulouse Olympique). Pickersgill also featured in the 2021 Challenge Cup in Round 1 (Featherstone Rovers). He scored against Halifax Panthers (2 tries), Whitehaven R.L.F.C. (1 try), Swinton Lions (2 tries), London Broncos (1 try), Oldham R.L.F.C. (2 tries) and Featherstone Rovers (1 try).

2022 - 2022 Season

It was announced that Pickersgill had returned to the Bradford Bulls on a short term loan deal.

Brandon featured in Round 15 (Sheffield Eagles). He scored against Sheffield Eagles (1 try).

Featherstone Rovers
On 18 Oct 2021 it was reported that he had signed for Featherstone Rovers in the RFL Championship for the 2022 season

Statistics

Statistics do not include pre-season friendlies.

References

External links
Profile at bradfordbulls.co.uk
Brandon Pickersgill at seriousaboutrl.com
Statistics at rugbyleagueproject.org

1998 births
Living people
Bradford Bulls players
English rugby league players
Featherstone Rovers players
Rugby league second-rows
Rugby league fullbacks
Rugby league five-eighths
Rugby league players from Bradford